William David Johnstone (20 February 1900 – 13 December 1979) was an Australian rules footballer who played with North Melbourne in the Victorian Football League (VFL).

Notes

External links 

1900 births
1979 deaths
Australian rules footballers from Victoria (Australia)
North Melbourne Football Club players